Sri Manik Prabhu Devasthanam is a Hindu temple located in  the Manik Nagar near, Humnabad in the state of karnataka, India

History
Manik Prabhu selected Manik Nagar as the significant and ideal place to lay the foundation of spiritual centre. Manik Nagar is located on high slope grounds. Manik Prabhu temple lies on the outskirts of Humnabad, a kilometer away from this taluka. The temple is located on the confluence of two rivulets Viraja and Guru Ganga.

People believe that Manik Prabhu, the renowned saint, was fourth incarnation of Lord Dattatreya. There was Political and religious chaos between two communities, Hindu and Muslim, and were the riotous times. Manik Prabhu had an envisioned these two streams (communities) come together and lead a peaceful life. Due to this prognostic vision, even today both Hindus and Muslims visit Manik Nagar every year to pay homage to the Great Founder of Universal Truth, the Sakalmata. Muslim community considers Shri Prabhu to be an Avatar of Mehaboob Subhani, a Muslim Saint.

Originally, a small hut was constructed to establish the GADI, or the Spiritual Seat, which in time to come was to be associated with the living spirit of Shri Manik Prabhu Maharaj. Sitting on the Gadi, he would give Darshan to audience and His very Darshan would give peace and contentment to all who visited Maniknagar.
In the Durbar, the people gathered would bask in the aura and the benevolent grace of Shri Prabhu. The entire atmosphere would be surcharged with spiritual splendour. Shri Prabhu would cast his compassionate glance on all, making everybody participate in the bliss, which he was experiencing.

Mahasamadhi

When Prabhu realised that the time had come to shed mortal body and be one with eternity. As Shri Prabhu was reluctant to disclose the time of his own departure to all, he took only three or four persons into confidence, those who understood the significance of his Avatar (incarnation). The news was kept in utmost confidence and all the required work was carried on with a smile on the face but with remorse in the heart. He advised them, 

On the tenth day of Margashirsha, Shri Prabhu decided to summon the Durbar, so that people could have his final Darshan. All arrangements were made for Shri Prabhu to sit in as comfortable a position as was possible.

The next day was Ekadashi, the eleventh day of the month. For Hindus it is one of the most auspicious day. This 29th day of the month of November 1865 was the day on which Srhi Prabhu had decided to take Samadhi and merge His Self with the Supreme Self.
Before samadhi He called two sons of His brother Narisimha and blessed them and thus the line of succession to the Gadi (spiritual seat) was laid down for all to know. He made the elder one Manohar the successor to Gadi by transferring His Eternal Energy to him. Thus the Guru-Parampara of Shri Manik Prabhu Sampradya was established for all time to come. The successors to the Gadi (spiritual seat) after Shri Manik Prabhu took Samadhi are:

Villages in Bidar district
Hindu temples in Bidar district